Grafenberg may mean:

 Düsseldorf-Grafenberg, a borough of Düsseldorf
 Grafenberg (Reutlingen), a town in Baden-Württemberg, Germany
 Grafenberg (Strengberg), a village in Austria
 Grafenberg (Wolfsbach), a village in Austria
 Ernst Gräfenberg, doctor known for developing the intrauterine device (IUD), and for his studies of the role of the woman's urethra in orgasm

See also
 Gräfenberg (disambiguation)